Events from the year 1731 in France

Incumbents
 Monarch – Louis XV

Events
9 April – The Diocese of Dijon established

Births

12 October – Jean-Baptiste Blanchard. Jesuit and educator (died 1797)

Full date missing
Jean-Louis de Boubers, printer, publisher and bookseller (died 1804)
André-Charles Cailleau, book publisher (died 1798)
Louis Claude Cadet de Gassicourt, chemist (died 1799)

Deaths

Full date missing
Étienne François Geoffroy, physician and chemist (born 1672)
Antoine Houdar de la Motte, author (born 1672)
Jean-François Leriget de La Faye, diplomat (born 1674)
Blaise Gisbert, Jesuit rhetorician (born 1657)
Charles Saint-Yves, ophthalmologist (born 1667)

See also

References

1730s in France